Lahachowk ( Nepali : लाहाचोक  ) is a village in Machhapuchchhre Gaunpalika , in the Kaski District, in the Gandaki Zone of northern-central Nepal. According to the 2011 National Population and Housing Census, it had a population of 3,129 in  829 individual households.

Lahachowk is not far from Mount Machhapuchchhre, a mountain in the Annapurna Himal. The village is ethnically and culturally diverse. Major ethnic groups in the village are Brahmin (43%), Dalit (28%), Chhetri (including Thakuri) (14%), and indigenous groups such as Gurung, Newar and Magar. The society is largely based on a caste structure. Higher castes like Brahmin and Chhetri have greater access to and control over resources and means of production. The people of higher caste generally have a higher educational status. The Hindu religion predominates, followed by Buddhism and a small number of Christians. The society in Lahachowk is a patriarchal one. The major occupation in the village is agriculture, which occupies around 46.7% of the population. Next are the labourers, up to 30.9%. Around 5.3% are working abroad, and government jobs account for 4.9%. Other jobs occupy around 11.5%, while business accounts for just 0.7%.

References

National Population and Housing Census, 2011

External links
UN map of the municipalities of Kaski District

Populated places in Kaski District